The Best Bad Man is a 1925 American silent Western film directed by John G. Blystone and written by Lillie Hayward. The film stars Tom Mix, Buster Gardner, Cyril Chadwick, Clara Bow, Tom Kennedy, and Frank Beal. The film was released on November 29, 1925, by Fox Film Corporation.

Plot
As described in a review in a film magazine, Hugh Nichols (Mix) is a wealthy tenderfoot idler who has never taken life seriously until a westerner demands that he complete a dam on his property that was promised by his father and is necessary for a score of ranches. As Hugh has already sent money to complete this project, he determines to investigate for himself, and disguises himself as a peddler of musical instruments. He finds that his agent is a crook, steals his own money back, and resists arrest until he can be identified. In the meantime he has fallen in love with Peggy (Bow), the leader of the ranchers. The villain dynamites the dam and Hugh saves the young woman.

Cast

See also
 Tom Mix filmography

Preservation status
A print of The Best Bad Man survives with the Museum of Modern Art, New York City.

References

External links

 
 

1925 films
1925 Western (genre) films
American black-and-white films
Fox Film films
Films directed by John G. Blystone
Silent American Western (genre) films
1920s English-language films
1920s American films